Inner Motion is an album by American pianist David Benoit released in 
1990, recorded for the GRP label. The album reached #3 on Billboards Jazz 
chart category.

Track listing
All tracks composed by David Benoit; except where indicated 
"M.W.A. (Musicians With Attitude)" (David Benoit, Marcel East, Nathan East) - 4:38
"Coconut Roads" - 3:45
"Every Corner of The World" (David Benoit, David Pack) - 5:24
"6-String Poet" - 5:14
"Houston" - 4:54
"Along Love's Highway" - 3:44
"Deep Light" - 4:21
"El Camino Real" (Eddie Arkin, David Benoit) - 4:42
"South East Quarter" - 4:56
"A Last Request" - 2:40

 Personnel 
 David Benoit – arrangements and conductor, acoustic piano (1, 2, 5, 8), synth brass (1), synth strings (1), electric piano (2, 3, 4, 6-10), Hammond B3 organ (6)
 Marcel East – synthesizer programming (1), drum machine (1)
 Pat Kelley – acoustic guitar (2, 8), electric guitar (2, 8)
 Paul Jackson, Jr. – guitar (3, 6)
 Grant Geissman – acoustic guitar (4, 5, 7, 10), 12-string guitar (5), Spanish guitar (5), banjo (5), mandolin (5), electric guitar (9)
 Neil Stubenhaus – bass guitar (2, 3, 6, 8)
 Steve Bailey – Arco bass (4), acoustic bass (5), fretless bass (5), vertical bass (7), 6-string fretless bass (9, 10)
 Vinnie Colaiuta – drums (1)
 John Robinson – drums (2, 3, 6, 8)
 David Derge – drums (4, 5, 7, 9, 10)
 Michael Fisher – percussion (2, 4, 5, 8, 10)
 Steve Forman – percussion (3, 6, 7, 9)
 Brandon Fields – alto saxophone (2, 8)
 Eric Marienthal – soprano saxophone (7, 10)
 Gary Herbig – clarinet (2, 8)
 Doug Cameron – violin solo (5)
 David Pack – lead vocals (3, 6), vocal arrangements (3, 6)
 Melinda Chatman – backing vocals (3, 6)
 Phillip Ingram – backing vocals (3, 6)
 Jean McClain – backing vocals (3, 6)
 Chuck Sabatino – backing vocals (3, 6)The Warfield Avenue Symphony Orchestra (Tracks 4, 5 & 10)'
 Bruce Dukov – concertmaster 
 Suzie Katayama – manager, copyist
 Jim Lacefield and Paul Zibits – bass
 Ernie Ehrhardt, Maurice Grants, Suzie Katayama and Harry Shlutz – cello 
 Amy Shulman – harp
 Renita Koven and Jimbo Ross – viola 
 Doug Cameron, Joel Deuroin, Marci Dicterow, Joseph Goodman, Peter Kent, Gina Kronstadt-Fields, Dimitrie Leivici, Sid Page, Charles Veal Jr., Shari Zippert and Michelle Zival-Fox – violin 
 Renee Grizzell and Ronald Landringer – piccolo flute
 Steven Holtman and Alex IIes – trombone 
 Bob Findley, Walter Johnson and Robert O'Donnel Jr. – trumpet 
 Michael Fisher and Scott Higgins – mallets

Production 
 Producers – David Benoit and Allen Sides
 Executive Producers – Dave Grusin and Larry Rosen
 Recorded and Mixed by Allen Sides and Bill Schnee
 Post-Production Editing – Joseph Doughney and Michael Landey
 Editing at The Review Room (New York City, NY).
 Mastered by Bernie Grundman at Bernie Grundman Mastering (Hollywood, CA).
 Technical Coordinator – Jeff Fair
 Production Coordination – Suzanne Sherman and Shari Sutcliffe
 Project Coordinator – William Anderson 
 Creative Director – Andy Baltimore
 Graphic Design – David Gibb, Jacki McCarthy, Andy Ruggirello and Dan Serrano.
 Photography – Michael Going 
 Additional Photography – Steve Anderson, Jana Angeles and Felicia Martinez.
 Management – Fitzgerald / Hartley Co.

Charts

References

External links
David Benoit-Inner Motion at Discogs

1990 albums
GRP Records albums
David Benoit (musician) albums